Marco Malagò (born 30 December 1978 in Venice, Italy) is a retired Italian footballer.

From January 2010 to July 2011, he left Chievo on loan. At first he joined Siena but the team relegated. After Triestina re-admitted to 2010–11 Serie B, he joined the team.

References

External links
 La Gazzetta dello Sport Player Profile 
 FIGC 

Italian footballers
Venezia F.C. players
Genoa C.F.C. players
Cosenza Calcio 1914 players
A.C. ChievoVerona players
Association football defenders
Serie A players
U.S. Triestina Calcio 1918 players
Serie B players
Footballers from Venice
1978 births
Living people